Chris Pavlou (born May 30, 1945) is an International banker and a business executive. He was  the Vice-Chairman of Cyprus Popular Bank. He was in this position since September 17, 2012.
On 28 March 2013 he resigned as Vice Chairman of Laiki Bank (Cyprus Popular Bank) but in April 2015 until December 2016 was appointed by the Central Bank of Cyprus in its capacity as resolution authority as Special Administrator of the legacy entity of Laiki Bank.

Banking career
Pavlou joined Barclays, London, in 1966 where he gradually moved up to the position of Deputy Chief Manager. He later spent five years in New York City as Senior Vice President
running Barclays Foreign Exchange and Money Markets in North America.

In February 1987  he joined the Hong Kong and Shanghai Banking Corporation Ltd.
(HSBC) as Chief Treasury Manager responsible for all Treasury activities.
Within five years the business was transformed into a market leader and profits
increases tenfold.

In August 1992, he was appointed Treasurer of HSBC with responsibility for all
treasury operations of Asia and Hang Seng Bank. He was a frequent visitor to the
bank´s 20 treasury operations in Asia. By 1995, HSBC was recognized as the
leading treasury Bank in Asia with the exception of Japan. In September 1995, he was posted to Tokyo as treasurer HSBC Midland in order to develop the Bank´s underperforming business there. Within three years
the goals were achieved.

In 1998, he joined Laiki Bank (23% owned by HSBC) as a
consultant and then as a member of its board.

In 2006, he joined TFI Markets, and under a successful three-year term he retired in October 2009. He remained as non-executive chairman until 2011.

In the media
Chris Pavlou has been featured in BBC’s foreign exchange documentary Billion Dollar Day The currency trading documentary was created by the British Broadcasting Corporation on June, 4th 1985 and it features Pavlou as Head of Treasury at Barclays Bank in London. He has also been interviewed several times regarding the 2012–13 Cypriot financial crisis by Reuters, Cyprus Mail, Channel 4 and other media.

Freedom of the City of London
He was awarded the famous Freedom of the City of London and thus enrolled in the usual ceremony in Guildhall, where he received a guide to conducting his life in an honourable fashion along with the sealed certificate.

Affiliations
Honorary member of the International Foreign Exchange Association
Member of the Worshipful Company of International Bankers
Non-Executive Director & member of the audit committee of National Bank of Greece
Non-Executive Director & member of the audit committee of Temenos
Non-Executive Director of Prosafe

References

External links

Chris Pavlou Business Profile at Bloomberg Businessweek
Chris Pavlou Video Link at BBC's Billion Dollar Day Documentary
Chris Pavlou Video Link at TFI Markets Interview
Chris Pavlou Video Link on Channel 4 News talking about the 2012–13 Cypriot financial crisis

1945 births
Living people
Greek Cypriot people